Hannes Þorsteinn Sigurðsson (born 10 April 1983) is an Icelandic football manager and former player who played as a forward. He is the manager of German club SV Wacker Burghausen.

Playing career
Hannes started his professional career with FH Hafnarfjordur in 2000, scoring on his debut and scoring one goal in eleven matches in 2001.

He moved to Norway to play for Viking FK in 2002, and although he came on as a substitute to score twice on his debut, he spent the best part of his first three seasons in Norway on the substitutes' bench. While he played in 55 matches during these three years, he only started in six of these. However, Hannes emerged as a super-sub, racking up twelve goals to make him the most efficient player in the Norwegian League with one goal every 72 minutes in 2002 and 2003. He emerged as a regular starter in 2005, when he also got his Iceland national team debut against Italy in March.

In July 2005, he signed for English club Stoke City on a Bosman transfer, and he joined his new club in October 2005. He scored his only goal for Stoke in a 2–1 victory over Queens Park Rangers in March 2006. When ownership of the club changed in the Summer 2006, and Boskamp left and Tony Pulis returned to the club, Hannes was deemed surplus to requirements and was released at the end of August.

On 30 August 2006, Hannes signed a deal with Danish Superliga runners-up Brøndby IF. He was a first-team regular throughout the autumn season, though injuries caused him to miss several games. He fell out of favour when manager René Meulensteen was replaced by Tom Køhlert ahead of the spring season, and Hannes looked to leave Brøndby.

Hannes returned to his former club Viking in February 2007, but his registration for the Norwegian club was delayed by the FIFA ruling that a player may only represent two clubs during one year. After a lengthy appeals process, Hannes was finally cleared to play for Viking on 30 March 2007 – one day before the closure of the Norwegian transfer window.

In March 2008, Hannes signed for Swedish club GIF Sundsvall, becoming the club's most expensive signing to date. Hannes was the club's top scorer in 2008, 2009 and 2010 even though he missed out on many games through injury. Following three successful years in Sweden, Hannes returned to Iceland to recover from a broken bone in his right foot that kept him sidelined for five months.

He then signed a short-term contract with his parent club FH Hafnarfjordur, where he played 13 games, scoring four goals.

In August 2011 Hannes joined PFC Spartak Nalchik in the Russian Premier League on a short-term contract. Hannes' style of play was not suitable for the Russian side, so his contract was not extended in January.

Hannes chose to stay in Eastern Europe, and in February 2012 he signed a one-year contract for FC Atyrau in Kazakhstan. Hannes finished the season as top scorer for the struggling FC Atyrau side and was voted as foreign player of the year by Westside.kz which is a fanclub for FC Atyrau.

Hannes signed a short-term contract with Swedish club Mjällby in 2013 and a two-year contract with recently promoted Austrian Bundesliga club SV Grödig in July 2013.

In 2015, he went on to SSV Jahn Regensburg. Ahead of the 2016 season he joined Norwegian third-tier side Egersunds IK as playing assistant to Maurice Ross.

Managerial career
In 2018, Hannes was appointed manager of German sixth tier club FC Deisenhofen. The club earned promotion to the fifth tier Bayernliga Süd in his first season. 

In April 2022, Hannes was hired by SV Wacker Burghausen in the fourth-tier Regionalliga Bayern.

Career statistics

Club

Notes

International

References

External links
 
 
 

1983 births
Living people
Hannes Sigurdsson
Hannes Sigurdsson
Hannes Sigurdsson
Hannes Sigurdsson
Hannes Sigurdsson
Hannes Sigurdsson
Hannes Sigurdsson
Viking FK players
Stoke City F.C. players
Brøndby IF players
GIF Sundsvall players
Mjällby AIF players
PFC Spartak Nalchik players
FC Atyrau players
SV Grödig players
SSV Jahn Regensburg players
Hannes Sigurdsson
Eliteserien players
Norwegian Second Division players
English Football League players
Allsvenskan players
Superettan players
Russian Premier League players
Kazakhstan Premier League players
Austrian Football Bundesliga players
3. Liga players
Expatriate footballers in Norway
Expatriate footballers in England
Expatriate men's footballers in Denmark
Expatriate footballers in Sweden
Expatriate footballers in Russia
Expatriate footballers in Kazakhstan
Expatriate footballers in Austria
Expatriate footballers in Germany
Hannes Sigurdsson
Hannes Sigurdsson
Hannes Sigurdsson
Hannes Sigurdsson
Hannes Sigurdsson
Hannes Sigurdsson
Hannes Sigurdsson
Hannes Sigurdsson
Association football forwards
Hannes Sigurdsson
Hannes Sigurdsson
Expatriate football managers in Germany
SV Wacker Burghausen managers